thumb|War Porn (2016), dust jacket cover
War Porn is a anti-war novel by Roy Scranton completed in 2011 and published in 2016 by Soho Press.

The novel presents structurally integrated stories told through both third- and first-person narratives presenting contrasting and complex perspectives on the Iraq war.

Scranton served with the US Army from 2002 to 2006, and was deployed as a Specialist with the 1st Armored Division to Baghdad in 2003 and 2004. The term "war porn" refers to graphic images of violence collected in war zones, often "viewed voyeuristically for emotional gratification."

Structure
War Porn is set just prior to and during the early years of the Iraq War (2003-2011)
The novel presents three main storylines, divided into five sections resembling the configuration similar to "Russian nesting dolls": "A-B-C-B-A." The intertwining narratives revolve around the US invasion and occupation of Iraq in the early years of the war and its impact on a number of American and Iraqi soldiers and civilians.

"Strange Hells" comprises the "A" narrative (sections 1 and 5, both set in a Utah suburb). The author employs a limited omniscient third-person point-of-view. The focal characters include Aaron "Sto" Stojanoski, a recently discharged corporal in the National Guard whose Military Police unit was deployed to Iraq in 2003 and stationed at Camp Crawford and the Abu Ghraib detention center. Dahlia, identified only by her first name.,is a disaffected suburban housemate and a key protagonist in this homefront narrative.

"Your Leader Will Control Your Fire" comprises the "B" narrative (sections 2 and 4, set in Baghdad in 2003 and 2004). The story is presented from a first-person confessional point-of-view. The protagonist is Army Specialist Wilson. Identified only by his rank and last name, he serves as a Humvee driver in combat zones in Baghdad. The "B" narrative dealing with Wilson is fragmented into vignette-like chapters, each two or three pages in length. The chapters are introduced with an epigraph which quotes from the U.S. Army Ethics and Combat Skills Handbook and the M16 Weapon Manual.

The "B" narrative is the only story that incorporates flashbacks: these are signaled by their presentation in italics. All the events described in Wilson's flashbacks are set in the United States.

"The Fall" is the single "C" section occurring sequentially at the mid-point of the other narratives. The author employs an omniscient third-person point-of-view. The central character is Qasim al-Zabadi, an Iraqi university mathematics professor living with his extended family in Baghdad and Baquba during the war; he later serves as an interpreter for US occupation forces.

The Babylon "prose-poems"
Each of the five sections in the novel are preceded by a unique "prose-poem", all uniformly entitled "Babylon". These stream of consciousness-like passages are amalgamations of the "fables, lies, half-truths, myths, delusions, and anxieties that underwrote the Iraq War" and include references to operations conducted by US military intelligence during the war.

Footnotes

Sources
Colla, Elliot. 2016. A Veteran Novel That Finds No Redemption in War. The Intercept, August 7, 2016. https://theintercept.com/2016/08/07/a-veteran-novel-that-finds-no-redemption-in-war/  Retrieved 27 November 2021.
Hefti, Matthew J. 2016. The Supply and Demand of War. Electric Literature.com 1 September 2016. https://electricliterature.com/the-supply-and-demand-of-war/ Retrieved 1 June 2022.
Hoenicke, Sarah. 2016. When the Hurlyburly's Done: Roy Scranton’s "War Porn" Los Angeles Review of Books. August 16, 2016. https://theintercept.com/2016/08/07/a-veteran-novel-that-finds-no-redemption-in-war/ Retrieved 27 May 2022.
London, Eric. 2016. (2) An Interview with Roy Scranton, author of War Porn. World Socialist Web Site. 1 September 2016. https://www.wsws.org/en/articles/2016/09/01/scra-s01.html Retrieved 20 November 2021.
London, Eric. 2016 (1) The anti-war novel re-emerges in American literature. World Socialist Web Site. 22 August 2016. https://www.wsws.org/en/articles/2016/08/22/warp-a22.html Retrieved 8 June 2022.
Molin, Peter. 2016. Right on Time, Five Years Later: Roy Scranton’s War Porn. Acolytesofwar.com August 3, 2016. https://acolytesofwar.com/2016/08/03/right-on-time-five-years-later-roy-scrantons-war-porn/ Retrieved 20 October 2021. 
Plum, Hilary. 2016. War Porn: An Interview with Roy Scranton. The Fanzine, thefanzine.com, September 26, 2016. http://thefanzine.com/war-porn-an-interview-with-roy-scranton/ Retrieved 2 June 2022.
Scranton, Roy. 2016. War Porn. Soho Press. 2016. 

Anti-war books
2016 American novels
Soho Press books